Wakoku is the name used by early imperial China and its neighbouring states to refer to the nation usually identified as Japan. There are various theories regarding the extent of power of the early kings of Japan. According to the Book of Sui and the History of the Northern Dynasties, its borders were five months from east to west and three months from north to south. The Wajin appear in historical documents such as the Book of Han and the Geographical Survey of Japan from around the 2nd century BC. In the late 7th century, the Yamato kingdom, which had been called Yamato, changed its external name to Japan, but its relation to Japan since Book of the Later Han is not clear. There are discrepancies in the descriptions of the Old Book of Tang and the New Book of Tang.

History

Formation of small states and the Civil War of Wa 

The word "wa (倭)" or "wajin (倭人)" first appeared in Chinese annals around 150 BC in the middle of the Yayoi period and corresponds to the Western Han period described in the Book of Han in China. According to the Book of Han, from the 2nd century BC to around 1 AD, wajin regularly visited the Han via its Korean colony of Lelang Commandery and tributary missions, and it is known that they formed a large number (described in the Book of Han as "more than 100") of polities.

In 57 AD, the chief of Wannu-no-kuni, which is said to have been located in northern Kyushu (along the coast of Hakata Bay), received a gold seal (King of Na gold seal) from Emperor Guangwu of Han."The Book of the Later Han, the Eastern Barbarians, "In the second year of Jianwu's reign, the Japanese kingdom paid tribute to Chaohe, and sent a man to call himself a great master, and Guangwu gave him a seal.It is believed that this was the result of the consolidation of Japanese polities in northern Kyushu, and that the Yamato State sent an envoy to the Eastern Han Dynasty as a representative of these groups.

The Nakoku found in the Wajinden of the Records of the Three Kingdoms is said to be located in the Fukuoka Plain. The King of Na gold seal, described in the Book of the Later Han, has been excavated from this area, and a Western Han mirror dating back to the 1st century BC has also been excavated. A royal tomb dating back to the 1st century BC has been found at the San'unnamikoji site (Itoshima City), which is thought to have been the center of the ancient "Ito Province”.。

About 50 years later, in the first year of Yongchu (107), the Japanese king Suishō sent an envoy to the Eastern Han Dynasty and presented 160 slaves."In the first year of the reign of Emperor An's Yongchu, the king of the Japanese kingdom, Shoushang, and others presented a hundred and sixty people to the court.The oldest person in Japanese history to have his name recorded in annals, Sho Masu was also the first person to be named King of Japan in historical records. Furthermore, the term "wakoku" also appeared for the first time. These facts suggest that it was during this period that the Wa polity was formed.

The Book of the Later Han was compiled in a much later period, and although this has led some to believe that a powerful political force representing the Japanese state to some extent emerged between the end of the 1st century and the beginning of the 2nd century, there is no evidence that Gouzu in each of the regions of the Japanese archipelago had any influence on the development of the Japanese state. The possibility that the king of Japan was also known as the King of Japan cannot be ruled out. In any case, from this time until the end of the 7th century, the political power representing/uniting the Yamato people continued to refer to itself externally as "Wakoku".
Wajinden

After Sho-masu, it is said that a male lineage succeeded to the throne of Yamato, but in the late 2nd century, a large-scale conflict broke out between the various political forces within Yamato (the Great War of Yamato).

Wajinden and Himiko 

This great uprising was settled when Himiko, who resided in Yamatai/Ibataikoku (see Ibataikoku), was appointed queen regnant of Japan. Himiko died in the 240s, and the next king of Japan was a male, but civil war broke out again, and the rebellion ended when another female, Taeyeo/Ichibayo (see Taiyo), became queen of Japan.

In the Records of the Three Kingdoms, Book of Wei, Biography of the Eastern Barbarians, Wajinden, there are several detailed descriptions of Emataikoku, Tsushima Province, Ichiji Province, Suerokoku, Itsukoku, Nakoku, and other provinces. It takes 20 days by water to reach Toumadai from Fumikuni, and 10 days by water and 1 month by land to reach the south from Toumadai to Yamataikuni. Queen Himiko of Yamatai-koku also paid tribute to Wei and was given the title of Wei-familial King of Wa.

After Iyo, the record of tribute to the Chinese dynasty by Wakoku was cut off for a while. According to the Kujiki, there were more than 120 Kuni-no-Miyatsu in various parts of the Japanese archipelago, forming regional states.

Among them, the kings of the Yamato kingdom, which is said to have been established by a confederation by the first half of the Kofun era in the 4th century, were known externally as "Yamato kings" or "Yamato kings," but the early Yamato kingdom was an alliance of Regional states of various powerful families and was not a despotic kingdom or dynasty. It was not. It is thought that kings of regional states sometimes referred to themselves externally as Wakoku Kings.

From the late 4th century, tribute to the Northern and Southern dynasties, such as the Eastern Jin Dynasty, was seen, and this tribute to the Southern Dynasty continued intermittently until the end of the 5th century. These were the Five kings of Wa, as described in the Book of Song, and five kings are known: San, Jin, Je, Heung, and Wu.

The king of Japan was called "King of Wako" or "King of Japan" to the dynasties of the Southern Dynasty on the continent, and domestically he was called "King" or "Okimi", as the inscription on an iron sword excavated from the Eta Funayama Kofun in Kumamoto Prefecture reads.

From Wa to Japan 

According to the Book of Sui, Wakoku is a country located in the southeastern part of Baekje/Silla, in the land of Sansenri. The country's territory stretches five months from east to west and three months from north to south. This information is found in the 81st volume of the Suisho Wakoku historical record, specifically in the 46th Dongyi Wakoku section.

In 607, a messenger of the Mission to Sui brought a national book to Sui. In this book, instead of using the notation "Wakoku," the country is referred to as "," . This notation is simply to indicate that Wakoku is in the east, as in Buddhist scriptures of the time.

As Japan developed, the word "倭" used to refer to the country became inappropriate, and there is a theory that it was changed to "Japan" for that reason. However, the notation of the national name remained Wakoku/Wa until the latter half of the 7th century.

When Baekje was destroyed in 660, the Japanese attempted to revive it, and the Battle of Baekgang broke out in 663 between the Tang dynasty and Silla, but they were defeated and forced to withdraw completely from the Korean peninsula. The first time the country was divided into two regions was in the 1960s. Emperor Tenmu]], who won the Imjin War in 672, accelerated the construction of the Ritsuryo State, and in the process, he tried to prevent the Tang Dynasty from invading Japan by showing the Northern Tang Dynasty that Japan was a separate country from the Southern Tang Dynasty and Japan from the Southern Tang Dynasty. The compilation of the Daiho Ritsūritsu, which regulated the new state system, was almost completed at the end of the 7th century, and it is said that the country name was changed from Wa (Japan) to Japan around 701, just before the implementation of the said code. Thereafter, the central political power in the Japanese archipelago would refer to itself as Yamato.

The New Tang Book and the Old Tang Book describe the change of the country's name at this time, saying that the name "Japan" was changed to "Japan. In both books, there is also a description that "Japan, originally a small country, annexed Japan," which is generally understood to refer to the Imjin War in which Emperor Tenmu destroyed the Omi Imperial Court of Emperor Kōbun. The "K" in "K" is the first letter of the Japanese alphabet. In the Sangokushi, a history book of the Korean Peninsula, "Shilla honki", December of the 10th year of King Munmu (670), there is an article that reads, "Japan is renamed as the Japanese nation. The article states, "Japan was renamed as 'Japan' in the 10th year of King Munmu's reign (670), and was named after its proximity to the rising sun. In the New Book of Tang, it is written that Me-tarishibikō was the first emperor to have contact with China.

For a while afterwards in Japan, "Yamato" was sometimes used to refer to Japan, but around the middle of the Nara period (the Tempyō-shōhō era), "Wa" (和), which has the same pronunciation, began to be used in combination, and gradually became the predominant character. The word "Japan" was initially read as "Yamato," but eventually came to be read phonetically as "Zippon" or "Nippon," which became established around the Heian era and has continued to the present day.

al-Wakwak 

In the Middle Ages Islamic world, the ninth-century Ibn Khordadbeh wrote "Book of Roads and Kingdoms" and the "Story of One Thousand and One Nights", and as a country east of China and India, al-Wakwak is mentioned as a place name, which some believe to be a reference to ''Japan.

See also 

 Wa (Japan)
 Wajin
 Yamato Kingship
 Goguryeo–Wa War
 Yayoi period
 Kofun period
 Yamatai
 Five kings of Wa
 Al-Wakwak

References

Published 

 西嶋定生『倭国の出現』東京大学出版会、1999年。ISBN 4-130-21064-5
 白石太一郎『日本の時代史1 倭国誕生』吉川弘文館、2002年。ISBN 4-642-00801-2

Bibliography 

 岩橋小弥太『日本の国号』吉川弘文館、新装版1997年（初版1970）。ISBN 4-642-07741-3
 岡田英弘『倭国』中央公論新社〈中公新書〉、1977年。ISBN 4-121-00482-5
 森浩一編『日本の古代1　倭人の登場』中央公論社、1985年。ISBN 4-124-02534-3
 田中琢『日本の歴史2　倭人争乱』集英社、1991年。ISBN 4-081-95002-4
 井上秀雄『倭・倭人・倭国』人文書院、1991年。ISBN 4-409-52017-2
 諏訪春雄編『倭族と古代日本』雄山閣出版、1993年。ISBN 4-639-01191-1
 西嶋定生『邪馬台国と倭国』吉川弘文館、1994年。ISBN 4-642-07410-4
 網野善彦『日本社会の歴史 上』岩波書店〈岩波新書〉、1997年。ISBN 4004305004
 吉田孝『日本の誕生』岩波書店〈岩波新書〉、1997年。ISBN 4-004-30510-1
 宮崎正勝『ジパング伝説』中央公論新社〈中公新書〉、2000年。ISBN 4121015584
 網野善彦『日本の歴史00 「日本」とは何か』小学館、2000年。ISBN 4-062-68900-6
 寺沢薫『日本の歴史02　王権誕生』講談社、2000年。ISBN 4-062-68902-2
 神野志隆光『「日本」とは何か』講談社〈講談社現代新書〉、2005年。ISBN 4-061-49776-6
 佐々木憲一「クニの首長」『古代史の基礎知識』角川書店〈角川選書〉、2005年。ISBN 4047033731
 吉村武彦・川尻秋生「王権と国家」『古代史の基礎知識』角川書店〈角川選書〉、2005年。ISBN 4047033731
 倉本一宏「大和王権の成立と展開」『新体系日本史1 国家史』山川出版社、2006年。ISBN 4634530104
 松木武彦『全集日本の歴史1 列島創世記』小学館、2007年。ISBN 4-096-22101-5

Former countries in Japanese history
Pages with unreviewed translations
States of the Wajinden